Shiokawa is a Japanese surname. Notable people with the name include:

, a Japanese politician
, a Japanese violinist
, a Japanese volleyball player
, a Japanese politician
, a Japanese footballer
, a Japanese baseball player

Japanese-language surnames